This is a list of electoral results for the Electoral district of Hastings in Victorian state elections.

Members for Hastings

Election results

Elections in the 2020s

Elections in the 2010s

Elections in the 2000s

References

 

Victoria (Australia) state electoral results by district